Otoko may refer to:

Ōtoko River, New Zealand river
Otoko, New Zealand, New Zealand settlement
Otoko, Nigeria

See also